United Nations Security Council resolution 1047, adopted unanimously on 29 February 1996, after recalling resolutions  808 (1993), 827 (1993), 936 (1994) and 955 (1994), the Council appointed Louise Arbour as Prosecutor at the International Criminal Tribunal for Rwanda (ICTR) and the International Criminal Tribunal for the former Yugoslavia (ICTY).

The Council noted the resignation of the former Prosecutor, Richard Goldstone, with effect from 1 October 1996, and decided that term of Louise Arbour, a Canadian judge, would begin on that date.

See also
 Bosnian Genocide
 Rwandan genocide
 List of United Nations Security Council Resolutions 1001 to 1100 (1995–1997)
 Yugoslav Wars

References

External links
 
Text of the Resolution at undocs.org

 1047
1996 in Yugoslavia
1996 in Rwanda
 1047
 1047
February 1996 events